WKFV (107.3 FM) is a radio station broadcasting a Christian Contemporary music format. Licensed to Clinton, North Carolina, United States, it serves the Fayetteville area. The station is currently owned by Educational Media Foundation, airing their K-LOVE format.

History
WKFV signed on as WCLN-FM in 1984. At one time, its format was urban contemporary, and the call letters were once WMXS.

Larry Carr of Clinton operated WCLN, a daytime-only station on 1170, and WCLN-FM (then at 107.1 FM) prior to the 1991 purchase of the 16-year-old stations by Willis Broadcasting Corp. of Norfolk, Virginia. The stations' format would be adult contemporary music and oldies.

WCLN and WCLN-FM were Christian when the FM station increased its power from 3000 to 25,000 watts and moved to 107.3 FM to better cover Fayetteville.

By 1997, WCLN was airing Southern gospel music separately from the FM.

In 2000, WCLN-FM relocated its tower from Salemburg, NC to its current location near Stedman, NC. In conjunction with the tower relocation, the station was granted FCC approval to relocate its Main Studio to Fayetteville, NC.

2004 brought leadership changes to the station. The format drifted from Inspiration to Adult Contemporary (AC) Christian music, becoming a Radio & Records reporting station in early 2005.

Effective December 15, 2017, Educational Media Foundation closed on the purchase of WCLN-FM from Christian Listening Network for $1.2 million. The same day, the station changed its call sign to WKFV.

Previous logo

References

External links

KFV
K-Love radio stations
Educational Media Foundation radio stations
KFV